Zairul Fitree Bin Ishak (born 2 April 1985) is a Malaysian professional footballer who plays as a left back. He is able to perform accurate cross from the left field and prefers to use his left foot which can score goals through dead ball situations.

Born and raised in Kota Bharu and began his football career with Kelantan's youth team. His senior debut playing for Kelantan FA after got promoted from youth team in 2005. He got the attention of coaches and has been a first eleven in every match.

Club career

Kedah FA
In October 2007 Zairul signed a two-year playing contract with the northern team, Kedah under Azraai Khor as head coach. Kedah clinched treble second times in the row during 2007-08 season after doing it on the last season. They retained all three cups Malaysia Super League, Malaysia Cup and Malaysia FA Cup. After a season with team, Zairul returned to play with Kelantan.

Kelantan FA
Zairul was given the number 24 shirt at Kelantan and since his return, Zairul always be in the starting line team and became the backbone of the team. He helped Kelantan win third place in the 2007–08 Malaysia Premier League. Zairul scored the winning goal during 2013 Malaysia Super League opening campaign with a 2-1 victory over PKNS at the Sultan Muhammad IV Stadium. Zairul fired home a rebounder from a free kick taken by team captain, Badhri Radzi.

Club

Honours

Kelantan President Cup Team
 Piala Presiden:2005

Kedah FA
 Piala Malaysia:2007, 2008
 Piala FA:2007, 2008
 Liga Super:2007, 2008
 Piala Sumbangsih:Runner Up 2008

Kelantan FA
 Liga Super: 2011, 2012; Runner-up 2010
 Piala Malaysia: 2010, 2012; Runner-up 2009, 2013
 Piala FA: 2012, 2013
 Piala Sumbangsih: 2011;Runner Up 2012,2013

Personal life
He is the owner of Jati Corner Restaurant in their hometown, Kota Bharu.

References

External links
 Profile at theredwarriorsfc.com
 Player Summary Zairul Fitree Ishak
 Zairul Fitree  at SoccerPunter.com
 

1985 births
Living people
People from Kota Bharu
Malaysian footballers
Kelantan FA players
Kedah Darul Aman F.C. players
People from Kelantan
Malaysia Super League players
Association football fullbacks
Malaysian people of Malay descent